Silentvalleya is a genus of Indian plants in the grass family.

 Species
 Silentvalleya chandwadensis Gosavi, B.R. Pawar & S.R. Yadav - near Chandwad in Maharashtra
 Silentvalleya nairii V.J.Nair, Sreek., Vajr. & Bhargavan - Lakshadweep, Kerala

References

Chloridoideae
Poaceae genera